Perpich v. Department of Defense, 496 U.S. 334 (1990), was a case decided by the United States Supreme Court concerning the Militia Clauses of Article I, Section 8, of the United States Constitution, in which the court held that Congress may authorize members of the National Guard to be ordered to active federal duty for purposes of training outside the United States without either the consent of the governor of the affected state or the declaration of a national emergency. The plaintiff was Rudy Perpich, governor of Minnesota at the time.

In 1986, after governors George Deukmejian of California and Joseph E. Brennan of Maine refused to allow the deployment of their states' National Guard units to Central America for training, Congress passed the Montgomery Amendment, which prohibited state governors from withholding their consent. Massachusetts governor Michael Dukakis had also challenged the law, but lost in U.S. District Court in Boston in 1988.

See Also
State defense force#Federal activation

References

Further reading

External links
 

United States Supreme Court cases
United States Supreme Court cases of the Rehnquist Court
United States military case law
1990 in United States case law
National Guard (United States)
Governor of Minnesota
United States–Central American relations